M. Ranga Rao (26 April 1932 – 3 August 1990) was a prominent Indian composer who predominantly worked in Kannada cinema. Rao was known for his mellifluous scores and lilting tunes backed with strong classical nuances. "Ranga Rao" composed tunes for approximately 100 films in Kannada cinema.

Personal life

Early life
Ranga Rao was born in a small village in Andhra Pradesh on 15 October 1932. He learnt the art of playing Veena instrument at a very young age. His inspiration was his mother, Rangamma. He graduated with Diploma in Mechanical Engineering stream.

Family
M. Ranga Rao was married to Syamala Devi and they have two sons and two daughters. His wife, Syamala, died five months after her husband's death in 1991.

Career
Rao entered the film industry as a small-time actor in the films Swarga Seema (1945) and  Yogi Vemana (1947). He worked a Veena player in the 1946 released film Tyagayya.

However, he entered the Kannada film industry as a full-fledged composer of the film Nakkare Ade Swarga in 1967. This also marked the beginning of the legendary playback singer S. P. Balasubrahmanyam.

Ranga Rao introduced (his relative) Balasubramanyam to Kannada films by offering him a duet song alongside the veteran singer P. Susheela.

Ranga Rao also worked as an assistant music director to veteran ace musician P. Adinarayana Rao for Telugu films 1. Pedda Koduku(1972) directed by K. S. Prakash Rao,   and 

2. Krishna (Telugu actor) 1974 historical magnanimous hit Alluri Seetarama Raju (film).

Along with composing numerous songs in Kannada, he also composed a few in Telugu, Tamil and Malayalam languages, most of them being the dubbed works of his Kannada songs.

Death
Ranga Rao died of cancer on 2 August 1990, aged 58. He was cremated in a crematorium in Bengaluru. He and his wife are survived by their four children, children-in-law and grandchildren.

Awards
1969 – Karnataka State Film Award for Best Music Director – Hannele Chiguridaga
1982 – Karnataka State Film Award for Best Music Director – Hosa Belaku
1984 – Karnataka State Film Award for Best Music Director – Bandhana

Discography
Kannada

Telugu
 Sardar Dharmanna (1987)
Tamil
Kudumbam Oru Koyil (1986)

See also
M. Ranga Rao on Saregama
M. Ranga Rao on Apple Music

References

1932 births
1990 deaths
Kannada film score composers
Telugu film score composers
Saraswati veena players
20th-century Indian composers
Film musicians from Andhra Pradesh
Indian male film score composers
20th-century male musicians